Shrewsbury Township is a township in Monmouth County, New Jersey, United States.  As of the 2010 United States Census, the township's population was 1,141, reflecting an increase of 43 (+3.9%) from the 1,098 counted in the 2000 Census, which was unchanged from the 1,098 counted in the 1990 Census.

Covering nearly  when it was first formed in 1693, Shrewsbury Township steadily diminished in size as 74 new municipalities were created from its former boundaries, leaving the township as it currently exists ranked as the state's smallest municipality by area.

History
Shrewsbury was part of the Navesink Patent or Monmouth Tract granted soon after the creation of East Jersey in 1665.

When it was formed in 1693, Shrewsbury Township covered an area of almost , extending to the north to the Navesink River, south to include all of present-day Ocean County, east to the Atlantic Ocean and west to the present-day border of Monmouth County. It retained its size and scope until 1750, when Stafford Township was formed, taking away most of present-day Ocean County. The Parker Homestead, one of the oldest buildings in state, was built by early settlers to the region.

What is now Shrewsbury Township was originally formed on October 31, 1693, and was created as a township by the Township Act of 1798 of the New Jersey Legislature on February 21, 1798.

Creation of new municipalities 

Over the centuries, portions of the township have been taken to form Stafford Township (March 3, 1750), Dover Township (March 1, 1768, now Toms River Township), Howell Township (February 23, 1801), Ocean Township (February 24, 1849), Atlantic Township (February 18, 1847, now Colts Neck), Red Bank (March 17, 1870), Eatontown (April 4, 1873), Rumson (May 15, 1907), Fair Haven (March 28, 1912), Little Silver (March 19, 1923), Shrewsbury borough (March 22, 1926) and New Shrewsbury (April 15, 1950, now Tinton Falls). The township was named for Shrewsbury, England.

The remaining land was formerly owned by the Government and called Camp Vail, a housing complex for families of Fort Monmouth employees. After World War II the government planned to close the site but the established families, with no where else to go, purchased the land from the Army with the help of Ann Switek who arranged to maintain the Original Township Charter which had been abandoned. Ann Switek was then elected Town Clerk of Shrewsbury Township and maintained that post for close to 50 years. Camp Vail became Alfred Vail Mutual Association, one of New Jersey's first cooperative housing entities. Following the end of Federal subsidies to Shrewsbury Township schools and services residents of the community outside the Vail Homes felt that the residents in the homes received undue benefits. They attempted to force the Vail Homes out of Shrewsbury Township but were unable to. They instead seceded from Shrewsbury to form New Shrewsbury which was later renamed Tinton Falls. Along with AVMA, Shrewsbury Township also contains Shrewsbury Arms apartments, a single convenience store/liquor store/deli called The Hideaway, and more recently, Shrewsbury Woods Townhouses.

Geography
According to the United States Census Bureau, the township had a total area of 0.1 square miles (0.26 km2), all of which was land.

Covering about  when it was established in 1693, a total of 74 municipalities have been established from its original territory, leaving Shrewsbury Township as the state's smallest municipality.

The borough borders the Monmouth County municipalities of Shrewsbury and Tinton Falls.

Demographics

Census 2010

The Census Bureau's 2006–2010 American Community Survey showed that (in 2010 inflation-adjusted dollars) median household income was $51,548 (with a margin of error of +/− $8,211) and the median family income was $55,625 (+/− $11,553). Males had a median income of $44,844 (+/− $7,203) versus $36,136 (+/− $6,032) for females. The per capita income for the borough was $28,891 (+/− $3,658). About 3.1% of families and 7.8% of the population were below the poverty line, including 6.7% of those under age 18 and 11.0% of those age 65 or over.

Census 2000

As of the 2000 United States Census there were 1,098 people, 521 households, and 254 families residing in the township.  The population density was 11,624.7 people per square mile (4,710.4/km2). There were 546 housing units at an average density of 5,780.6 per square mile (2,342.4/km2). The racial makeup of the township was 66.76% White, 16.67% African American, 10.02% Asian, 2.82% from other races, and 3.73% from two or more races. Hispanic or Latino of any race were 6.65% of the population.

There were 521 households, out of which 24.6% had children under the age of 18 living with them, 28.6% were married couples living together, 16.3% had a female householder with no husband present, and 51.1% were non-families. 39.5% of all households were made up of individuals, and 11.7% had someone living alone who was 65 years of age or older.  The average household size was 2.10 and the average family size was 2.89.

In the township the population was spread out, with 20.6% under the age of 18, 9.3% from 18 to 24, 37.8% from 25 to 44, 21.5% from 45 to 64, and 10.8% who were 65 years of age or older.  The median age was 35 years. For every 100 females, there were 93.3 males.  For every 100 females age 18 and over, there were 90.0 males.

The median income for a household in the township was $36,875, and the median income for a family was $42,500. Males had a median income of $32,813 versus $30,598 for females. The per capita income for the township was $23,574. About 6.9% of families and 8.8% of the population were below the poverty line, including 12.7% of those under age 18 and 11.8% of those age 65 or over.

Government

Local government 
Shrewsbury Township is governed under the Township form of New Jersey municipal government, one of 141 municipalities (of the 564) statewide that use this form, the second-most commonly used form of government in the state. The governing body is comprised of the three-member Township Committee, whose members are elected directly by the voters in partisan elections to serve three-year terms of office on a staggered basis, with one seat coming up for election each year as part of the November general election in a three-year cycle. At an annual reorganization meeting, the Township Committee selects one of its members to serve as Mayor.

, members of the Shrewsbury Township Committee are Mayor Lester J. Jennings (D, term on committee ends December 31, 2023; term as mayor ends 2022); Deputy Mayor Lynda Lettice (D, term on committee ends 2024; term as deputy mayor ends 2022) and Glenwood J. Puhak (D, term ends 2022).

With Maryellen McNama-Bailly taking office in January 2015, control of the council shifted to the Republican Party. Control of the Township Committee shifted back to the Democratic Party on January 1, 2017, with the election of Glen Puhak in the November 2016 General Election. With Lester J. Jennings defeating incumbent Republican Maryellen McNama-Bailly in the 2017 General Election, Democrats had full control of the council.

In 2018, the township had an average property tax bill of $4,169, the lowest in the county, compared to an average bill of $9,227 in Monmouth County and $8,767 statewide.

Federal, state and county representation 
Shrewsbury Township is located in the 4th Congressional District and is part of New Jersey's 11th state legislative district. Prior to the 2011 reapportionment following the 2010 Census, Shrewsbury Township had been in the 12th state legislative district.

 

Monmouth County is governed by a Board of County Commissioners comprised of five members who are elected at-large to serve three year terms of office on a staggered basis, with either one or two seats up for election each year as part of the November general election. At an annual reorganization meeting held in the beginning of January, the board selects one of its members to serve as Director and another as Deputy Director. , Monmouth County's Commissioners are
Commissioner Director Thomas A. Arnone (R, Neptune City, term as commissioner and as director ends December 31, 2022), 
Commissioner Deputy Director Susan M. Kiley (R, Hazlet Township, term as commissioner ends December 31, 2024; term as deputy commissioner director ends 2022),
Lillian G. Burry (R, Colts Neck Township, 2023),
Nick DiRocco (R, Wall Township, 2022), and 
Ross F. Licitra (R, Marlboro Township, 2023). 
Constitutional officers elected on a countywide basis are
County clerk Christine Giordano Hanlon (R, 2025; Ocean Township), 
Sheriff Shaun Golden (R, 2022; Howell Township) and 
Surrogate Rosemarie D. Peters (R, 2026; Middletown Township).

Politics
As of March 23, 2011, there were a total of 638 registered voters in Shrewsbury Township, of which 229 (35.9%) were registered as Democrats, 114 (17.9%) were registered as Republicans and 294 (46.1%) were registered as Unaffiliated. One voter was registered to another party.

In the 2016 presidential election, Democrat Hillary Clinton received 57.9% of the vote (260 cast), ahead of Republican Donald Trump with 36.1% (162 votes) and other candidates with 6.0% (27 votes), among the 449 ballots cast by the township's 679 registered voters, for a turnout of 66.13%.In the 2012 presidential election, Democrat Barack Obama received 66.1% of the vote (286 cast), ahead of Republican Mitt Romney with 29.8% (129 votes), and other candidates with 4.2% (18 votes), among the 438 ballots cast by the township's 655 registered voters (5 ballots were spoiled), for a turnout of 66.9%. In the 2008 presidential election, Democrat Barack Obama received 62.1% of the vote (300 cast), ahead of Republican John McCain with 34.8% (168 votes) and other candidates with 2.5% (12 votes), among the 483 ballots cast by the township's 679 registered voters, for a turnout of 71.1%. In the 2004 presidential election, Democrat John Kerry received 57.8% of the vote (263 ballots cast), outpolling Republican George W. Bush with 40.7% (185 votes) and other candidates with 0.8% (5 votes), among the 455 ballots cast by the borough's 640 registered voters, for a turnout percentage of 71.1.

In the 2013 gubernatorial election, Republican Chris Christie received 62.2% of the vote (166 cast), ahead of Democrat Barbara Buono with 35.2% (94 votes), and other candidates with 2.6% (7 votes), among the 271 ballots cast by the township's 651 registered voters (4 ballots were spoiled), for a turnout of 41.6%. In the 2009 gubernatorial election, Democrat Jon Corzine received 44.1% of the vote (135 ballots cast), ahead of Republican Chris Christie with 44.1% (135 votes), Independent Chris Daggett with 7.5% (23 votes) and other candidates with 2.6% (8 votes), among the 306 ballots cast by the township's 643 registered voters, yielding a 47.6% turnout.

Education 
Public school students in kindergarten through eighth grade attend the three schools in the Tinton Falls School District, a regional district that also serves students from the neighboring community of Tinton Falls and the dependent children of military families based at Naval Weapons Station Earle. All three of the district's schools are located in Tinton Falls. Shrewsbury Township is represented with one seat out of nine on the district's board of education. As of the 2020–21 school year, the district, comprised of three schools, had an enrollment of 1,331 students and 153.4 classroom teachers (on an FTE basis), for a student–teacher ratio of 8.7:1. Schools in the district (with 2020–21 enrollment data from the National Center for Education Statistics) are 
Mahala F. Atchison Elementary School with 438 students in grades K–3, 
Swimming River Elementary School with 440 students in grades 4–5 and 
Tinton Falls Middle School with 446 students in grades 6–8.

Students in public school for ninth through twelfth grades attend Monmouth Regional High School, located in Tinton Falls. The school also serves students from Eatontown, Tinton Falls and Naval Weapons Station Earle. As of the 2020–2021 school year, the high school had an enrollment of 953 students and 90.2 classroom teachers (on an FTE basis), for a student–teacher ratio of 10.6:1. Seats on the high school district's nine-member board of education are allocated based on the populations of the constituent municipalities, with one seat assigned to Shrewsbury Township.

Students may also apply to attend one of the magnet schools in the Monmouth County Vocational School District—Marine Academy of Science and Technology, Academy of Allied Health & Science, High Technology High School, Biotechnology High School, and Communications High School.

Transportation

No Interstate, U.S., state or county highways serve Shrewsbury Township directly. Only municipally maintained streets cross the township, the longest of which is Crawford Street. Nearby major roads that are accessible in neighboring municipalities include CR 520, CR 537, Route 18, Route 35, Route 36, Route 71, and the Garden State Parkway.

Notable people

People who were born in, residents of, or otherwise closely associated with Shrewsbury Township include:

 John M. Corlies (1868–1926), politician who served on the Monmouth County, New Jersey Board of Chosen Freeholders, the Shrewsbury Township Committee, and as mayor of Rumson

References

External links

Township website
Tinton Falls Public Schools

School Data for the Tinton Falls School District, National Center for Education Statistics
Monmouth Regional High School District
Property, hazard, and crime stats at PogoData

 
1693 establishments in New Jersey
Populated places established in 1693
Township form of New Jersey government
Townships in Monmouth County, New Jersey